Lochriea is an extinct genus of conodonts.

Use in stratigraphy 
The Visean, the second age of the Mississippian, contains four conodont biozones, two of which are named after Lochriea species:
 the zone of Lochriea nodosa
 the zone of Gnathodus bilineatus
 the zone of Lochriea commutata
 the zone of Pseudognathodus homopunctatus

The Serpukhovian, the third or youngest age of the Mississippian, includes three conodont biozones, one of which is named after Lochriea species:
 the zone of Gnathodus postbilineatus
 the zone of Gnathodus bollandensis
 the zone of Lochriea ziegleri

References

External links 
 
 

Conodont genera
Mississippian conodonts
Fossil taxa described in 1942